Piotr Kosiorowski (born 5 January 1981) is a Polish former footballer.

External links
 

1981 births
People from Świdwin County
Sportspeople from West Pomeranian Voivodeship
Living people
Polish footballers
Association football midfielders
Polonia Warsaw players
Wisła Płock players
Świt Nowy Dwór Mazowiecki players
KSZO Ostrowiec Świętokrzyski players
Ząbkovia Ząbki players
Sandecja Nowy Sącz players
MKP Pogoń Siedlce players
Ekstraklasa players
I liga players
II liga players